is a UK Supreme Court case that reconsidered the test used for determining dishonesty.

Facts 
Phil Ivey, an American professional poker player, played and won a series of games of Punto Banco—a variant of baccarat—at Crockfords Casino in London, owned by Genting Casinos (UK) Ltd. The casino did not pay out the £7.7m he had won, as they believed Ivey had cheated by using edge sorting. Ivey sued the casino to recover his winnings.

Both Ivey and the casino agreed that the contract contained an implied term forbidding cheating. Ivey's lawyers argued that the appropriate test for whether cheating occurred was the same for contract as it was in section 42 of the Gambling Act 2005, and that cheating necessitated dishonesty, which had not been shown.

At trial, High Court Judge John Mitting held that cheating had occurred and the contract was thus invalid. The Court of Appeal upheld the trial judge's ruling 2–1.

Decision 

The Supreme Court held that Ivey had cheated, and was thus not entitled to the payment sought from Genting Casinos. Lord Hughes considered at length whether the existing test for dishonesty was acceptable, noting that dishonesty in civil contexts is judged objectively. The existing test had been developed in the case R v Ghosh, and required firstly that the act would be considered dishonest by an ordinary, reasonable person, and secondly that the accused would have realised that what they were doing was, by those standards, dishonest. This second component was ruled to be inadequate and only the first part of the earlier test was applied.

Reception 

In the High Court case of DPP v Patterson, Sir Brian Leveson observed that:

David Ormerod and Karl Laird criticised the direction of the law following Ivey, arguing that the lack of a subjective element will lead to uncertainty and a possible human rights challenge under Article 7, citing a prior challenge to Ghosh.

References

External links 
 Judgment on BAILII

Supreme Court of the United Kingdom cases
Gambling case law
2017 in British law